The eighth and final season of the animated series WordGirl was originally broadcast on PBS in the United States beginning June 10, 2015.

{| class="wikitable plainrowheaders" style="width:100%; margin:auto; background:#FFFFFF;"
|-
! scope=col style="background-color: #FA8072; color:#000; text-align: center;" width=20|No. inseries
! scope=col style="background-color: #FA8072; color:#000; text-align: center;" width=20|No. inseason
! scope=col style="background-color: #FA8072; color:#000; text-align: center;"|Title
! scope=col style="background-color: #FA8072; color:#000; text-align: center;"|Written by
! scope=col style="background-color: #FA8072; color:#000; text-align: center;" width=30|Original airdate
! scope=col style="background-color: #FA8072; color:#000; text-align: center;" width=20|Productioncode
|-

|}

References

2015 American television seasons
WordGirl seasons